A selective school is a school that admits students on the basis of some sort of selection criteria, usually academic. The term may have different connotations in different systems and is the opposite of a comprehensive school, which accepts all students, regardless of aptitude.

The split between selective and comprehensive education is usually at secondary level; primary education is rarely selective. At the university level, selection is almost universal, but a few institutions practice open admissions or open-door enrollment, allowing students to attend regardless of prior qualification.

Australia

New South Wales

In New South Wales, selective high schools are government schools that select students on the basis of academic ability. Most students enter a selective high school in Year 7, after sitting the Selective High Schools Test in the previous year. The process of entering selective schools is much like that of a university, with students electing their preferences and being chosen for schools based on their performance on the Selective High Schools Test.

Compared to the other states, New South Wales has many more selective schools than other states, (see List of selective high schools in New South Wales).

Victoria
In Victoria, Australia, there are four general selective schools:  Melbourne High School, Mac.Robertson Girls' High School, Nossal High School and  Suzanne Cory High School. 

There are also a number of selective schools specialising in specific areas, such as the Victorian College of the Arts Secondary School (specialising in the arts), John Monash Science School (specialising in science), Maribyrnong College (specialising in sport) and the Flying Fruit Fly Circus School (a circus school). The University High School also operates a selective science-specialist subschool called Elizabeth Blackburn Sciences. 

In addition to these, there are also over 40 schools in Victoria offering Select Entry Accelerated Learning (SEAL) programs, in which academically gifted students may either complete secondary education in five years (instead of six) or complete their Victorian Certificate of Education in three years (instead of two). 

All students who seek to enrol in the fully selective schools or in the partially selective SEAL schools must sit entrance examinations, with the exception of  a few of the specialist schools.

Queensland
In Queensland, there are four selective entry high schools: Brisbane State High School, which is partially selective and formed in 1921, and the three Queensland Academies, which are fully selective and were formed in 2007/8.  All require entry based on academic entry tests, Naplan results, primary school grades, interviews and other considerations.  In 2005, the premier of Queensland, Peter Beattie announced as part of the Smart State Strategy the additional creation of the Queensland Academies "as an innovative alternative educational program for highly capable high school students." There are three Queensland Academies for students Years 10 to 12 and all study the International Baccalaureate Diploma Program which in 2019 had a yearly fee of $2,291.45.  In 2019 QASMT additionally opened entry to grade 7 students.  Brisbane State High School is for Years 7 to 12 and does not have an International Baccalaureate Diploma Program fee, although a fee is payable (less than $260 in 2019), with its membership in the Great Public Schools Association of Queensland and Queensland Girls' Secondary Schools Sports Association.

The Queensland Academy for Science, Mathematics and Technology (QASMT) at Toowong was opened in 2007. It has a partnership with the University of Queensland  at St Lucia.  The Queensland Academy for Creative Industries (QACI) at Kelvin Grove opened in 2007. It has a partnership with the Queensland University of Technology Creative Industries Precinct at Kelvin Grove.  The Queensland Academy for Health Sciences opened on the Gold Coast (QAHS) in 2008. It has a partnership with Griffith University at the Gold Coast.
In the University of NSW ICAS competition for 2018, university medals (The highest result in the state) were awarded to: Brisbane State High School 13 Medal/s, QASMT 1 Medal/s, QACI 0 Medal/s and QAHS 1 Medal/s.  In the same competition for 2017 university medals were awarded to Brisbane State High School 12 Medal/s, QASMT 1 Medal/s, QACI 0 Medal/s and QAHS 0 Medal/s.  In 2018 in Queensland there were 733 OP 1's Overall Position (The highest possible result high school graduates can receive in Queensland and a 99+ ATAR.) out of which 67 (9.14% of the Queensland total) were achieved at Brisbane State High School.

Western Australia
In Western Australia, selective secondary education (officially named Gifted and Talented Education (GATE)) is operated by the Western Australian Department of Education through the Gifted and Talented Selective Entrance Programs for Year 7, and subject to limited placement availability for year-levels upward to Year 11. All applicants are required to sit the Academic Selective Entrance Test and possibly complete combined interviews, auditions and/or workshops depending on the program(s) applied for. The programs are categorized into three strands: academic, language, and arts. Eighteen state schools participate in the Gifted and Talented Programs, each specializing in one of the strands. All participating schools are partially selective and partially local intake, with the exception of Perth Modern School which is fully selective.

United Kingdom
Most schools in the UK are now comprehensive schools, which are non-selective.
However, there are still 164 grammar schools in several counties of England, which select pupils either on the basis of an Eleven-plus examination, by an internally set and moderated examination, or by both. There are no selective state schools in Scotland or Wales, however some of their independent schools may require an entrance test to gain admission.

Some formerly Grant Maintained schools were selective by means of exams, tests, interviews; or a combination of all three. Three notable examples of highly selective Grant Maintained schools were St Olave's Grammar School, The John Fisher School in Surrey and The London Oratory School in Fulham, London.

These Local Education Authorities continue to maintain a fully selective education system:

Several other LEAs have a mainly non-selective system but a few selective schools exist alongside their comprehensive counterparts, these are; Barnet, Birmingham, Bromley, Calderdale, Cumbria, Devon, Enfield, Essex, Gloucestershire, Kirklees, Lancashire, Liverpool, North Yorkshire, Plymouth, Redbridge, Stoke-on-Trent, Walsall, Warwickshire, Wiltshire, Wolverhampton, Telford and The Wrekin.

There are also a smaller number of partially selective schools in England.

In Northern Ireland, secondary education is predominantly based on academic selection, although a number of comprehensive schools also exists. Selection is carried out by an exam taken in the final year of Primary school.  A significant number of secondary schools in Northern Ireland cater only for male or for female pupils. In addition, there is a parallel system of Catholic schools, with a parallel selection system.

United States
Selective schools in the United States are typically high school level, and are often also specialized schools.  In New York City, students must take the competitive Specialized High Schools Admissions Test prior to possible admittance to one of the schools.  Though many selective schools are of the high school level, there are also schools which provide to lower aged students. One example is the Logan School for Creative Learning in Colorado which admits students 1st-8th grade mainly by IQ testing.

Germany

The German public school system is fundamentally selective after four years of elementary school. The selective Gymnasium (grades 5 through 12 or 13, depending on the state) is supposed to prepare pupils for university. The German Realschule is also a selective school, though with lower requirements, ending at grade 10.

The pros and cons of a selective school system are a constant issue in discussions about German schools, while many parents take strong efforts to make their children attend Gymnasium.

Attendance of Gymnasium had strongly increased in the second part of the 20th century to the majority of pupils in many areas. As a consequence, mainly pupils with rather low aptitudes remained for the non-selective Hauptschule, traditionally the third main tier (and originally the main tier) of the German school system. Some German federal states have abolished the three-tier system in favour of a combination of Realschule and Hauptschule, starting about 1997. Such non-selective schools are called differently, e.g. "advanced Realschule" or the "Realschule Plus", Sekundarschule or Integrierte Sekundarschule.

Iran
NODET, also known as SAMPAD, schools are national selective schools (middle and high school level) in Iran developed specifically for the development of exceptionally-talented students. The organization was first founded in 1976, as the National Iranian Organization for Gifted and Talented Education (NIOGATE). These schools were shut down for a few years after the revolution but later reopened. In 1988 the organization was renamed to National Organization for Development of Exceptional Talents.

Admission to NODET schools is selective and based on a comprehensive nationwide entrance examination procedure. Every year thousands of students apply to enter, the schools, but less than 5% are chosen. All applicants must have a minimum GPA of 19 (out of 20) for attending the entrance exam. In 2006, 87,081 boys and 83,596 girls from 56 cities applied, and 6,888 students were accepted for the 2007 middle schools.

See also
Magnet school

References

School types
Philosophy of education
University and college admissions